Tamishi is a village in the Ochamchira District in Abkhazia, Georgia. It is located on the Black Sea coast, at the right side of Dghamshi river. Its altitude above sea level is around 10 m, the distance to Ochamchire is 14 km.

The Abkhaz Census of 2011 reported that Tamishi had a population of 549.

Aslan Bzhania was born in Tamishi.

See also 
 Ochamchire District

Sources 
 Georgian Soviet Encyclopedia, Volume 9, p. 651, Tbilisi, 1985.

Notes and references

Populated places in Ochamchira District